William Wilson Watt (born 17 December 1861) was a Scottish footballer who played as a winger and centre forward.

Career
Born in Glasgow, Watt played club football for  Queen's Park, and made one appearance for Scotland in 1887, scoring one goal. He played in the final of the English FA Cup with Queen's Park in 1884 (as well as being a member of the squad that claimed the Scottish Cup in the same year, though no final was played), and won the Glasgow Merchants Charity Cup a year later.

References

1861 births
Date of death missing
Scottish footballers
Scotland international footballers
Queen's Park F.C. players
Association football wingers
Association football forwards
FA Cup Final players